An awning or overhang is a secondary covering attached to the exterior wall of a building. It is typically composed of canvas woven of acrylic, cotton or polyester yarn, or vinyl laminated to polyester fabric that is stretched tightly over a light structure of aluminium, iron or steel, possibly wood or transparent material (used to cover solar thermal panels in the summer, but that must allow as much light as possible in the winter). The configuration of this structure is something of a truss, space frame or planar frame. Awnings are also often constructed of aluminium understructure with aluminium sheeting. These aluminium awnings are often used when a fabric awning is not a practical application where snow load as well as wind loads may be a factor.

The location of an awning on a building may be above a window, a door, or above the area along a sidewalk. With the addition of columns an awning becomes a canopy, which is able to extend further from a building, as in the case of an entrance to a hotel. Restaurants often use awnings broad enough to cover substantial outdoor area for outdoor dining, parties, or reception. In commercial buildings, an awning is often painted with information as to the name, business, and address, thus acting as a sign or billboard as well as providing shade, breaking strong winds, and protecting from rain or snow. In areas with wintry weather, most awnings do not have to be taken down at the end of the summer – they can remain retracted against the building all winter long, or be designed and built for those conditions.

History

Ancient world
Awnings were first used by the ancient Egyptian and Syrian civilizations. They are described as "woven mats" that shaded market stalls and homes. A Roman poet Lucretius, in 50 BC, said "Linen-awning, stretched, over mighty theatres, gives forth at times, a cracking roar, when much 'tis beaten about, betwixt the poles and cross-beams".

Among the most significant awnings in the ancient world was the velarium, the massive complex of retractable shade structures that could be deployed above the seating areas of the Roman Colosseum. Made of linen shadecloths, timber framing, iron sockets and rope, the system could effectively shade about one-third of the arena and seating; another third could be shaded by the high surrounding walls, providing a majority of seats some shade on a blinding afternoon. It is believed that sailors, with their background in sailmaking and rigging were employed to build, maintain and operate the velarium.

Early 19th century

Awnings became common during the first half of the 19th century. At that time they consisted of timber or cast iron posts set along the sidewalk edge and linked by a front cross bar. To lend support to larger installations, angled rafters linked the front cross bar to the building facade. The upper end of the canvas was connected to the facade with nails, with grommets and hooks, or by lacing the canvas to a head rod bolted to the facade. The other (projecting) end of the canvas was draped over or laced to a front bar with the edge often hanging down to form a valance. On ornate examples, metal posts were adorned with filigree and the tops decorated with spear ends, balls or other embellishments. On overcast days or when rain did not threaten, the covering was often rolled up against the building facade; during the winter months proper maintenance called for the removal and storage of awnings. Photographs from the mid-19th century often show the bare framework, suggesting that the covering was extended only when necessary. Canvas duck was the predominant awning fabric, a strong, closely woven cotton cloth used for centuries to make tents and sails.

Awnings became a common feature in the years after the American Civil War. Iron plumbing pipe, which was quickly adapted for awning frames, became widely available and affordable as a result of mid-century industrialization. It was a natural material for awning frames, easily bent and threaded together to make a range of different shapes and sizes. At the same time the advent of the steamship forced canvas mills and sail makers to search for new markets. An awning industry developed offering an array of frame and fabric options adaptable to both storefronts and windows.

Late 19th century

In the second half of the 19th century, manufactured operable awnings grew in popularity. Previously, most awnings had fixed frames-the primary way to retract the covering was to roll it up the rafters by hand. Operable systems for both storefront and window awnings had extension arms that were hinged where they joined the facade. The arms were lowered to project the awning or raised to retract the awning using simple rope and pulley arrangements. Because the canvas remained attached to the framework, retractable awnings allowed a more flexible approach to shading (shopkeepers and owners could incrementally adjust the amount of awning coverage depending upon the weather conditions). When the sun came out from behind clouds, the awning could be deployed with ease. In case of sudden storms, owners could quickly retract the awning against the building wall where it was protected from wind gusts.

Despite their advantages, early operable awnings had drawbacks; when retracted, their cloth coverings often bunched up against the building facade. This left part of the fabric exposed to inclement weather, and deterioration was often accelerated by moisture pooling in the folds of fabric. If poorly designed or badly placed, the retracted fabric could obscure part of the window or door opening, and even if out of the way an imperfectly folded awning presented an unkempt appearance.  Modern materials and designs have eliminated all of these issues.

Benefits

Retractable awnings let owners control the weather on their own terms.  When passing showers threaten, or when the sun gets hot, they or the home automation system unroll the awning for near-instant protection and shade. Lab test measurements show that it can be as much as 20 degrees Fahrenheit cooler under an awning's canopy. Because awnings prevent the sun from shining through windows and sliding glass doors, they can keep temperatures inside cooler as well, which saves on air-conditioning costs.  They can help prevent carpets and furniture from fading in sunlight.  Awnings also provide a sheltered place for children and pets to play, shielded from direct sun.

Some of today's awnings also offer accessories that can greatly increase the versatility and usefulness owners get from their decks or patios.  A screen room add-on can easily turn an awning into a virtually bug-free outdoor room, side screening cuts down on wind and mist coming under the sides of awnings, and patio lights let people enjoy their decks evenings and nights.

It also can be used to cover the thermal solar panels in the summer.

Types

Propulsion 

Today's awnings come in two basic types: manually operated models which are opened by hand and motorized models which operate by electricity.  Each offers its own advantages. Benefits include low-cost affordability, easy adaptability to almost any deck or patio, and support arms that can be angled back against the house or set vertically on the deck or patio floor.  These arms provide extra support and stability which some owners prefer in windy areas, and increase the awning's versatility by making the attachment of certain accessories available.

Motorized awnings have no vertical supports. Instead, they have retracting lateral arms, creating an unobstructed shaded area.  These awnings are operated by an electric motor, generally hidden inside the roller bar of the awning.  The arms open and close the awning at the touch of a wireless remote control or a wall-mounted switch.

Modern awnings may be constructed with covers of various types of fabrics, aluminium, corrugated fibreglass, corrugated polycarbonate or other materials. High winds can cause damage to an extended awning, and newer designs incorporate a wind sensor for automatic retraction in certain conditions.

Wind tolerance and construction

Modern awnings are rated for wind tolerance based on width, length, number of supporting arms, and material. Modern awning design incorporates urethane compression joints, steel support structures, and wind sensors. Such designs are currently in use at the White House, Grand Central Station, and the Kremlin.

Aluminium awnings
Aluminium awnings have long been popular in residential applications throughout the world. They are available in many colors and are usually painted with a baked-on enamel paint. Among the many benefits of these awnings are cooler temperatures inside the home, shade for your patio, extending the life of furniture and window treatments. Possibly the most beneficial feature of the awnings are the fact that they have a usable life of well over 40 years.

Some aluminum awnings are designed to be folded down and fastened to protect windows in case of storms such as hurricanes.

Retractable awnings 

Retractable awnings are now becoming very popular with homeowners in the United States. They have been popular in Europe for many years, due to higher energy costs and lack of air conditioning.

Some retractable awnings can include photovoltaic cells or rollable solar panels to generate electricity.

Retractable awnings can include the following types:

Retractable patio cover systems 
Retractable patio cover systems are the latest "entry" in to the retractable market. Most of these systems are water-proof as compared to water-resistant (lateral arm awnings) and therefore allow no water penetration through the  fabric "roof" section. These systems meet Beaufort scale wind loads up to Beaufort 10 (55 - 63 mph) depending on model and size. Another advantage of retractable patio cover systems is that they can be enclosed on the front and sides using solar shade screens. This allows for an "outdoor room" that can be heated in the winter and air conditioned in the summer.

Retractable lateral arm awnings or Folding Arm Awnings 
These are a modern version of the old storefront crank-up awnings of the last century. The two, three or four tension arms (width dependent) and a top tube are supported by a torsion bar. With a Traditional 'Open Style' folding arm awning the torsion bar a.k.a. square bar fits into wall or soffit or fascia or roof mounted brackets that spread the load to the wall or roof truss. The newer 'Full Cassette' style of folding arm awning does away with the torsion bar and uses an aluminium extrusion that interlocks with brackets that in-turn spreads the cantilevered force imposed by the awning into the structure it is fitted to.
Hand-cranked awnings are still available, but motorized awnings are now most common due to advances in technology, manufacturing & reliability over the last few decades. The motor is inside the roller tube that the fabric rolls around and therefore is not visible. Many motors now have a built-in receiver and are operated by remote control, smartphone, tablet or home automation.

Normally a single folding arm awning can only span  in a single system due to difficulties transporting, storing and powder coating extrusion greater than this size.

The most common fabric choice for folding arm awning is solution dyed acrylic fabric that comes in a variety of styles, colours, patterns as well as performance grades for water repellence and fire retardancy. Solution dyed acrylic fabric is the most suitable fabric for use in these awnings due to dimensional properties, ease of manufacturing, weight (versus woven mesh) & high levels of filtering of and resistance against UV.

Retractable side or drop arm awnings 

Commonly used to shade a window, with a roller tube at the top, spring-loaded side arms, and a motor, crank or tape-pull operator. Awnings with sides are commonly known as traditional style awnings as they have been used for many years dating back to the early 19th century using cotton canvas fabric. Canvas was replaced in the 1960s by more acrylic materials and polyester in more recent times driven by a focus on the environment. Traditional style awnings are appropriate for historical buildings and are still popular today using a more weather resistant fabric and a rope and pulley system for retracting the awnings. Awnings without sides do not provide as much sun protection as those with sides. Awnings without sides come in many different styles. Drop Arm Awnings without sides come with roller tubes at the top and are available with motors and wind sensors for automatic retraction.  Spear Awnings are made without sides and are made with Wrought Iron Frames and they can be retracted with a rope and pulley system but are not available with motors.

Awnings with sides provide the best sun protection for east and west facing windows. North and South facing windows can be protected from the sun with awnings without sides. Awnings provide shade keeping your house cooler, awnings are also great shade creators around porches, decks and patios.

Portable, pop-up canopies 

A portable pop-up canopy or tent provides a cost-effective temporary solution to people who want to enjoy shade.  The portable designs offer versatility to take the unit to social events. The frame usually incorporates an accordion-style truss which folds up compactly.

Retractable solar shade screens 
Shade screens utilize acrylic canvas or a mesh fabric, which allows some view-through while blocking the sun's rays. The roller at the top may be hand-cranked or motorized. The fabric is gravity-fed, with a weighted bottom rail pulling the fabric down between guide rails or guy wires. Exterior shades are much more effective at blocking heat than interior shades, since they block the heat before it enters the glass.  This style of framed screen is typically done by professional installers, because of the specialized frames and tools required. A recent advancement is frame-less shade screens, which allows a "DIY-er" to install their own exterior shades. Solar shade screens can also be installed at the end of awnings to provide horizontal shade during early morning or late afternoon sun positions.

Retractable solar window awnings 
Retractable solar window awnings are made from fabric. They are resistant to hail and harsh winter weather. Many solar window awnings can be programmed to open and close automatically in response to the sun.

Shade sails
Shade sails provide semi-horizontal shading. They can be demounted with some difficulty and are usually left in place year round. Retractable versions also exist, with greater cost but also greater utility, as they can be retracted to admit winter sun if required.

Trade organizations
Industrial Fabrics Association International (IFAI) is a trade organization which includes the awning trade, with a division called the Professional Awning Manufacturers Association (PAMA).

Classification numbers
Construction Specifications Institute (CSI) Division 10 MasterFormat 2004 Edition:

 10 73 13 - Awnings
 10 73 16 - Canopies
 10 71 13 - Exterior Sun Control Devices
 10 71 13.43 - Fixed Sun Screen
 10 73 00 - Protective Covers (Generic)

CSI MasterFormat 1995 Edition:

 10530 - Protective Covers, Awnings & Canopies

See also

 Brise soleil
 Curtain
 Overhang (architecture)
 Rope
 Solar panel
 Tent
 Umbrella
 Verandah
 Window blind

References

Architectural elements
Low-energy building
Windows
Shading (Architecture)
Passive cooling